Margaret Eleanor Barbour Simpson,  (13 October 1906 – 1 November 1994) was a Scottish archaeologist. She is considered as the first professional woman archaeologist in Scotland. She was a member of V. Gordon Childe's team of archaeologists at Skara Brae and Kindrochat, as well as the writer of some of the first guidebooks for state-owned historic properties in Scotland.

Early life 
Margaret Simpson grew up in Edinburgh, within a family of medics. She was the daughter of George Freeland Barbour Simpson, a Scottish physician, and Caroline Elizabeth Barbour, the granddaughter of Sir Alexander Russell Simpson (1838-1916), and the great-great niece of Sir James Young Simpson (1811-1870).

Career 
She matriculated at the University of Edinburgh in 1925. From 1928 to 1929, she attended an archaeology class taught by Gordon Childe, entitled the First Ordinary Archaeology Class. From 1929-30 she was the first secretary of the Edinburgh League of Prehistorians. She was elected as a Fellow of the Society of Antiquaries of Scotland in 1930. Her appointment in 1930 as the Assistant Inspector of Ancient Monuments is considered as the first professional female archaeologist in Scotland. In a letter to Simpson, regarding her application, Gordon Childe wrote: "I am really very keen that they should get the right person and I think that you are it. It’s good to have a woman." She held the post until 1948. In 1941, she married Frederick Root and the couple lived in London before moving to Surrey in 1944. Some of her later publications are credited to Margaret E. Root, confusingly including some that are reprints of publications originally crediting her as Margaret Simpson.

Archaeology

Skara Brae Excavation 1927-1930 
Simpson participated in the excavation at Skara Brae, led by Prof. Gordon Childe in the years 1927–1930, and was later acknowledged by him in a monograph on the subject. She also features in several photographs from the excavation (currently in the collection of Orkney Library and Archive), along with other female archaeologists (Margaret Mitchell, Mary Kennedy, and Dame Margaret Cole). They were initially considered to be either tourists or local women visiting the site, but are now identified as Prof. Childe's students and members of his excavation crew.

Kindrochat Excavation 1929-1930 
In 1929 Simpson was also one of the team of archaeologists who excavated the chambered cairn at Kindrochat (aka Kindrochet) in Perthshire, once more under the leadership of Gordon Childe. In his later correspondence he wrote that "she was entrusted with the examination of one of the megalithic chambers and produced, quite unaided, an excellent plan with elevations." Her drawings and observations can be found in the Proceedings of the Society of Antiquaries of Scotland.

Guidebooks 
She collaborated with James Richardson on some of the first guidebooks for state-owned properties in Scotland. These include Stirling and Balvenie Castles (1936) and Inchmahome Priory (1936) with Richardson, and Dunkeld Cathedral (1935) as a sole author.

References 

Scottish archaeologists
Fellows of the Society of Antiquaries of Scotland
British women archaeologists
1906 births
1994 deaths
20th-century antiquarians
Alumni of the University of Edinburgh